Elisha Ann Cuthbert (born 30 November 1982) is a Canadian actress and model. As a child actress, she made her first televised appearance as an extra in the Canadian horror-themed series for children Are You Afraid of the Dark? and co-hosted Popular Mechanics for Kids. She made her feature film debut in the 1997 Canadian family-drama Dancing on the Moon. Her first major lead role came in the 1998 drama film Airspeed (No Control) alongside Joe Mantegna. In 2001, she starred in the movie Lucky Girl, for which she received her first award, the Gemini Awards.

After moving to Hollywood in 2001, she was cast as Kim Bauer in the series 24, her first big role in an American production, alongside Kiefer Sutherland. For this role, she was nominated for Screen Actors Guild Awards twice. In 2003, she played Darcie Goldberg in the college comedy Old School and Carol-Anne in Love Actually. Cuthbert received wide recognition for her breakout role as Danielle in the 2004 teen comedy film The Girl Next Door, being nominated for Best Breakthrough Performance at the 2005 MTV Movie Awards, and for her next role as Carly Jones in the 2005 House of Wax, for which she received two nominations for the Teen Choice Awards, including Best Actress: Action/Adventure/Thriller. Subsequently, Cuthbert appeared in the lead role in the drama The Quiet (2005) and the horror Captivity (2007). This role, along with Are You Afraid of the Dark?, 24 series and House of Wax, established her as a scream queen.

From 2011 to 2013, Cuthbert starred as Alex Kerkovich in the three seasons of the ABC comedy Happy Endings. From 2016 to 2020, she had a recurring role as Abby Phillips on the Netflix series The Ranch, before becoming a main cast member in the series' second season. She received praise for her performance on the Canadian comedy series Jann (2020), being nominated for the Canadian Screen Awards for Best Performance in a guest role.

Cuthbert is considered a sex symbol and has appeared in numerous magazines, such as Maxim, Complex, and FHM. In 2013, Maxim magazine named her "TV's most beautiful woman".

Early life
Elisha Ann Cuthbert was born in Calgary, Alberta, the daughter of Kevin, an automotive design engineer and Patricia, a housewife. She grew up in Greenfield Park, Quebec. In 2000, she graduated from Centennial Regional High School and moved to Los Angeles at the age of 17. As a child, she participated in Girl Guide programs as a member of Girl Guides of Canada.

Career

Early work 
When she was nine, Cuthbert began modeling children's clothing whilst appearing as a foot model. She made her first televised appearance as an extra in Are You Afraid of the Dark?, a horror-themed series for children; she later became a regular on the show. Cuthbert co-hosted Popular Mechanics for Kids with Jay Baruchel, filmed in Montreal. Her reporting captured the attention of Hillary Clinton, who invited her to the White House.

Cuthbert landed a role in a feature film in the family drama Dancing on the Moon (1997). She appeared in other Canadian family films and in an airplane thriller, Airspeed. In 2000, Cuthbert co-starred in Believe, a Canadian film with Ricky Mabe. The following year she starred in the Canadian television movie, Lucky Girl, and was awarded a Gemini Award for her performance.

2000s 

Soon after moving to Hollywood, she was cast as Kim Bauer, daughter of federal agent Jack Bauer, in the television series 24. She appeared in the show's first three seasons, but not in its fourth; she guest-starred in two episodes in the fifth season. She also reprised her role as Kim Bauer in 24: The Game and again guest-starred in five episodes of the seventh season and in two episodes of the eighth season.

She began her Hollywood film career with small roles in Old School, which grossed $87 million. Cuthbert next appeared in Love Actually, which earned $246.4 million worldwide.

Her first break in a major film role was in 2004, The Girl Next Door. She played an ex–porn star, Danielle, opposite Emile Hirsch. She had reservations about taking the part, but director Luke Greenfield persuaded her to accept the role. Cuthbert did research for the film speaking to adult actresses from Wicked Pictures and Vivid Entertainment. The film was compared to Risky Business although Cuthbert said her character was not directly based on Rebecca De Mornay's. Critics were divided; some praised the film for boldness, while others, notably Roger Ebert, called it gimmicky and exploitative. Ebert wrote that he saw Cuthbert's character as "quite the most unpleasant character I have seen in some time."
The View London said: "Cuthbert is surprisingly good, too – aside from being drop dead gorgeous, she also proves herself a capable comic actress in the Cameron Diaz mould". Cuthbert won two nominations for the MTV Movie Awards for Best Kiss and Best Breakthrough Performance.

In her next film, Cuthbert starred with Paris Hilton and Chad Michael Murray in the 2005 remake of the horror film House of Wax. In one scene, her character attempted to open her mouth while her lips were sealed with glue. For realism, she used Superglue over prosthetics. House of Wax was largely panned, critics citing a range of flaws. It was called "notable for having some of the most moronic protagonists ever to populate a horror film," though of those characters, critics tended to think Cuthbert "did the best". Though it received negative reviews the film was a box office success, which grossed $70 million worldwide. The Houston Chronicle cited Cuthbert as an exception. Mick LaSalle of the San Francisco Chronicle said of the film, "Elisha Cuthbert's matter-of-fact, likable quality helps. Seeing her turn into wax would be as bad as seeing that happen to Glenda Farrell (the star of the 1933 version)." The Movie said: "The performances are always professional and understated in their believable cogency, particularly Cuthbert, a talented, beautiful young actress who has proven time and again just what a multilayered and promising future she has ahead of her. Cuthbert digs into the role of Carly with strength, determination, and horrified realism; you believe as you watch her that she is going through these things and forget all about the actor playing the part, which is the biggest compliment of all. Brian Orndorf of Filmjerk.com said: "[Paris] Hilton ... only plays her known personality in the film. She's overshadowed by the strong work from the rest of the cast, notably Chad Michael Murray and especially Elisha Cuthbert, who gives the film a strong dose of enthusiasm with her Jamie Lee Curtis-esque performance." Cuthbert was nominated at Teen Choice Awards in two categories Choice Movie: Actress – Action / Adventure / Thriller and Choice Movie: Rumble.

Cuthbert's next film was the indie film The Quiet. She was a co-star and co-producer. She played Nina, a 17-year-old cheerleader who is sexually abused by her father. Cuthbert looked to her younger cousin as her inspiration in portraying a teenager. The Quiet, distributed by Sony Pictures Classics, premiered at the 2005 Toronto International Film Festival and received a limited release in Los Angeles and New York City on 25 August 2006 before expanding regionally in the US on September 1. Cuthbert initially wanted to play the part of the silent Dot, but director Jamie Babbit cast Camilla Belle in the role instead after Thora Birch pulled out. Babbit reasoned "To me, Dot has to be someone you could believe would be invisible in high school. You look at Elisha, this beautiful woman with the most perfect body you've ever seen, and you think, there's no high school in America where this girl could be invisible. No matter how much hair and makeup I do, it's not going to happen." The Daily Californian conceded that "Despite the plot's failings, Cuthbert does a convincing job in her role, exuding an outer shell so tough that when her inner, softer layers emerge, it's a natural change of character. Empire Movies agreed, commenting "this is Elisha Cuthbert's best film performance to date. Cuthbert's Nina has the majority of the most graphic and disturbing dialogue in the film, especially during one particular lunchroom scene where the camera is close up on Cuthbert and Belle's faces."

Cuthbert appeared in the music video for Weezer's "Perfect Situation" in early 2006, playing the group's fictional original singer who threw a tantrum that led to Rivers Cuomo, the roadie, becoming the band's frontman. She also had a small role in Paris Hilton's music video for the song "Nothing in This World".

In 2007, Cuthbert appeared in Captivity, a thriller centered on a fashion model taunted by a psychopath who imprisons her in a cellar. She was nominated for a Razzie award as Worst Actress and Teen Choice Awards for Choice Movie Actress: Horror/Thriller for the movie. The film grossed $10.9 million at the box office. The critic Stephen Whitty of the Newark Star-Ledger said, "When, in the last few minutes, Cuthbert finally slipped her bonds and began looking for her tormentors, I knew exactly how she felt." The View London said: "The worst Cuthbert struggles to make her character sympathetic because the script doesn't give her anything to work with, while Daniel Gillies is too creepy-looking to convince as a potential love interest."

In He Was a Quiet Man, Cuthbert played Vanessa, a quadriplegic; she starred alongside Christian Slater. The film was in limited release in 2007, and it was released on DVD in early 2008. The critic Peter Bradshaw in his review for The Guardian praised Cuthbert's performance, writing that she "is very good". In 2008, Cuthbert appeared in My Sassy Girl, a remake of a Korean film, starring with Jesse Bradford. Nikhat Kazmi of The Times of India said the "Elisha is cute and their zany affair keeps the reels rolling in an unusual love story with the usual heartbreak and happy home-comings". Although Lacey Mical (Callahan) Walker of Christian Spotlight on Entertainment was not impressed by Bradford performance, she praised Cuthbert's, saying, "Elisha Cuthbert's talent rises above the character she was given to play, and she almost saves the bitter first half with a stellar performance".

Her next film was the family comedy, The Six Wives of Henry Lefay with Tim Allen, in which she played his daughter. She starred in the Canadian miniseries Guns. She was a judge in season two, episode two of Project Runway Canada. Designers were challenged to create a "party dress" for her. Cuthbert reprised her character Kim Bauer in the seventh season of 24 for five episodes. She was to star in the CBS drama pilot Ny-Lon, playing a New York literacy teacher/record-store clerk who embarks on a transatlantic romance with a London stockbroker. The project, based on a British series starring Rashida Jones and Stephen Moyer, was cancelled.

In December 2009, ABC said Cuthbert had joined the cast of The Forgotten in a recurring role as Maxine Denver, a Chicago professional. It was expected for Cuthbert to play the role of Trixie in sports action- comedy film Speed Racer (2008), but Christina Ricci was eventually chosen.

2011–present 
From April 2011 to May 2013, Cuthbert starred as Alex Kerkovich for three seasons on the ABC ensemble comedy Happy Endings alongside Eliza Coupe, Zachary Knighton, Adam Pally, Damon Wayans Jr., and Casey Wilson. Despite critical acclaim and having a cult following, the show was canceled by ABC after the conclusion of its third season on 3 May 2013. Cuthbert was nominated for the Online Film & Television Association Award in 2012 and 2013 in the category of "Best Cast in a Comedy Series" and TV Guide Awards for Favorite Cast. The series was also nominated for 28 other awards including the Satellite Awards for Best Series comedy television or music. Cuthbert's performance received positive reviews from critics. In 2013, she was regarded as a promising contender for an Emmy Award in the Outstanding Supporting Actress in a Comedy Series category, however she was not nominated.

In 2012, Cuthbert was host of the American Music Awards. In October 2012, she appeared in The Gaslight Anthem's music video "Here Comes My Man", playing the girlfriend of a man who mistreats her until she imagines a romantic relationship with a character in a film and chooses to end her real relationship.

In 2013, she appeared on the cover of Maxim, which named her TV's Most Beautiful Woman.

In February 2014, Cuthbert signed to play the female lead role in Liz Feldman and Ellen DeGeneres' NBC sitcom pilot One Big Happy. Cuthbert stars as Lizzy, a lesbian who gets pregnant just as her straight male best friend Luke (played by Nick Zano) meets and marries the love of his life, Prudence. Six episodes of the show were ordered on 9 May 2014, and it debuted mid-season in early 2015. The series was canceled after one season.

In 2015, Cuthbert joined Seann William Scott in a sequel to the 2011 comedy Goon. Goon: Last of the Enforcers began production in June in Toronto. Liev Schreiber and Alison Pill reprised their roles from the first film.

In 2016, Cuthbert joined the cast of Netflix's The Ranch, a comedy series. In 2020, she started the film Eat Wheaties!. She is set to star the horror movie The Cellar, Bandit and the comedy Friday Afternoon in the Universe. For her performance in the comedy series Jann (2020), she was nominated for the Canadian Screen Awards for Best Guest Performance.

Public image

Since she began playing Kim Bauer, she has frequently been named to the magazines FHM and Maxim's annual lists of "hottest women". Her highest ranking was No. 4 in the 2008 UK Edition of FHM's 100 Sexiest Women in the World list. She was ranked No. 14 in 2003, No. 10 in 2004, No. 5 in 2005, No. 22 in 2006, No. 10 in 2007, and No. 7 in 2009. The U.S. Edition ranked her No. 53 in 2003, No. 63 in 2004, and No. 54 in 2006.

Cuthbert was ranked No. 10 by AskMen.com readers in the list "Top 99 Women of 2007." In Maxims Hot 100 list, she was ranked No. 84 in 2002, No. 9 in 2003, No. 21 in 2004, No. 92 in 2006, No. 25 in 2007, No. 6 in 2008, No. 43 in 2009, No. 65 in 2011, No. 34 in 2012, and No. 10 in 2013. The magazine also featured her in its Girls of Maxim Gallery. In 2013, the magazine named her the Most Beautiful Woman in Television. BuddyTV ranked her No. 33 on its TV's 100 Sexiest Women of 2011 list, No. 13 in 2012, and No. 30 in 2015. She was included in the list of The 15 Best Comedy Supporting Actresses of the 2011–2012 TV Season and 2012–2013 TV Season. The Canadian Business named her one of the most powerful Canadians in Hollywood, and The New York Daily News listed her as one of the Sexiest Canadian celebrities of 2016.

Complex has ranked her in The 25 Hottest Canadian Women, The 100 Hottest Women of the 2000s, The 25 Hottest Blonde Bombshell Actresses, and The 50 Hottest Celebrity Sports Fans. In 2013, GQ magazine listed her among The 100 Hottest Women of the 21st Century and The 100 Sexiest Women of Millennium.

Personal life
Cuthbert has two younger siblings and enjoys painting. She is also an ice hockey fan. In 2005, she maintained a blog on the NHL website, though she did not post for most of the season.

Marriage
Cuthbert and hockey player Dion Phaneuf, then the captain of the Toronto Maple Leafs, announced their engagement in September 2012, They married on 6 July 2013 at St. James Catholic Church in Summerfield, Prince Edward Island. Living in Ottawa during the hockey season, Cuthbert and Phaneuf spend their summers at their waterfront estate outside New London, Prince Edward Island in his parents' home province. The couple have two children together, a daughter born in 2017 and a son in 2022.

Filmography

Film

Television

Web

Music videos

Video games

Awards and nominations

References

External links

 
 

20th-century Canadian actresses
21st-century Canadian actresses
1982 births
Actresses from Calgary
Actresses from Quebec
Anglophone Quebec people
Canadian bloggers
Canadian child actresses
Canadian expatriate actresses in the United States
Canadian female models
Canadian film actresses
Canadian television actresses
Living people
People from Longueuil
Canadian women bloggers